Who Is Sylvia? is a 1950 comedy play by the British writer Terence Rattigan about a man obsessed with the image of a woman he met as a seventeen year old and his search for her throughout the rest of his life. The play offered a thinly veiled portrayal of Rattigan's own philandering father. Like Perchance to Dream, Ivor Novello's long-running musical terminating only two years previously, Rattigan chose a line from William Shakespeare for his title. The line is the first wistful question of a song passage in The Two Gentlemen of Verona.

Original production
The play opened at the Criterion Theatre, London, on 24 October 1950, with the following cast:

Mark - Robert Flemyng
Williams - Esmond Knight 
Daphne - Diane Hart
Sidney - Alan Woolston
Ethel - Diana Allen
Oscar - Roland Culver
Bubbles - Diana Hope 
Nora, - Diane Hart
 Denis -  David Aylmer 
 Wilberforce - Roger Maxwell
 Doris - Diane Hart
Chloe - Joan Benham
Caroline - Athene Seyler

Reception
Although it ran for over a year, it was not considered as successful as several of the playwright's previous works. This was especially so critically, with the Evening Standard's Beverley Baxter writing, "This Will Not Do, Mr Rattigan."

Film adaptation
The play was adapted into a 1955 film The Man Who Loved Redheads.

References

Bibliography
  David Pattie. Modern British Playwriting: The 1950s: Voices, Documents, New Interpretations. 2013.

1950 plays
British plays adapted into films
Plays by Terence Rattigan
West End plays